Classics II is the eighth studio album by Canadian country music artist George Canyon. It was released on November 20, 2012 by Reiny Dawg and distributed by Universal Music Canada.

Track listing

References

2012 albums
George Canyon albums
Universal Music Canada albums
Covers albums